Robert Brunschvig (6 October 1901 – 16 February 1990) was a French historian, orientalist and professor at the University of Paris.

Born in Bordeaux, Brunschvig was educated at the École normale supérieure. After his agrégation, he taught at the Lycée Carnot in Tunis from 1922 to 1930. After a year at the Lycée Montaigne in Paris, he taught at the University of Algiers from 1932 to 1946. He then taught at Bordeaux from 1947 to 1955, and at the Sorbonne until his retirement in 1968. 

He was elected a Fellow of the British Academy (FBA) in 1973.

References

External links 

 Robert Brunschvig documents at the Bibliothèque nationale de France

1901 births
1990 deaths
French orientalists
French historians
École Normale Supérieure alumni
Academic staff of the University of Paris
Corresponding Fellows of the British Academy